The Belfast metropolitan area, also known as Greater Belfast, is a grouping of council areas which include commuter towns and overspill from Belfast, Northern Ireland, with a population of 672,522 in 2011, combining the Belfast, Lisburn, Newtownabbey, North Down, Castlereagh and Carrickfergus districts. This equates to 37.1% of Northern Ireland's population.

Overview
The area was first officially classified as a metropolitan area in the late 1990s when the British government began to prepare for a cohesive plan that would include the Belfast Region. Six local government districts – Belfast, Castlereagh, Carrickfergus, Lisburn, Newtownabbey and North Down, were identified as the key areas within the metropolitan area. The continuous built-up area centred on Belfast, which is contained within these six districts, is defined as the Belfast Metropolitan Urban Area. The Belfast metropolitan urban area had a population of 579,276 in 2001.

The area is made up of established towns, their overspill and the general conjoining of settlements as Belfast expands. Established towns include Carrickfergus, Bangor, Lisburn and Holywood. Many of these towns were established and important long before Belfast rose to prominence; Carrickfergus, for example, was the Norman capital of the northern part of Ireland until Edward Bruce's defeat in 1318. Bangor had been an important centre of Christianity and learning from its foundation in 555 AD. The recent reclassification of Lisburn as a city does not change its position within the metropolitan area.

Places in the conurbation

2001 census
At the 2001 census, the demographic characteristics of the people living in Belfast metropolitan urban area (BMUA) were as follows:

22.0% were aged under 16 years and 19.2% were aged 60 and over
47.4% of the population were male and 52.6% were female
40.5% were from a Catholic background, 55.5% were from a Protestant background.
4.3% of people aged 16–74 were unemployed

Population maps
In the 2011 UK Census, the distributions of population, religion, national identity and proportion of immigrants within the Belfast metropolitan area,  were as follows.

References

See also
Districts of Belfast
Greater Dublin
Derry Urban Area
Greater Cork
List of conurbations in the United Kingdom
Dublin-Belfast corridor

Cities in Northern Ireland
Geography of Belfast
Local government in Belfast
Metropolitan areas of Ireland
Urban areas of the United Kingdom